Benigna Gottliebe von Trotta genannt Treyden (15 October 1703 – 5 November 1782), was a Duchess consort of Courland. She married the Duke of Courland, Ernst Johann von Biron, on 25 February 1723.

Biography
Benigna Gottliebe was the daughter of the Baltic nobleman Wilhelm von Trotta genannt Treyden (died in 1725) and his wife Anna Elisabeth von Wildemann. She was made a lady-in-waiting to the dowager duchess regent of Courland, Anna of Russia, in 1720, and in 1723 married to Anna's adviser Ernst Johann von Biron (Bühren). The marriage was reportedly arranged by Anna in an attempt to conceal her own relationship with Biron.

Russia
When Anna became Empress of Russia in 1730, the Biron couple both followed her to Russia, retaining their position as adviser and lady in waiting. Benigna is described as haughty and bad tempered and marked with smallpox, but also as a diligent parent and lady in waiting. She spent great amounts of money on clothes and jewelry and also received many costly gifts from Anna.

Duchess of Courland
When her husband was made duke of Courland in 1737, she was decorated with the Order of Saint Catherine. She shared her husband's imprisonment in 1740 and returned with him to Courland in 1763, where she spent the rest of her life at the court in Mitau (Jelgava).

She is described as a good painter and textile artist, and she and her daughter embroidered a tapestry of silk which were displayed in the Jelgava Palace. She also published a book of religious German language poems, published in Moscow in 1777 entitled "Eine große Kreuzträgerin".

Issue 
 Peter von Biron (1724–1800)
 Hedwig Elizabeth von Biron (1727–1797)
 Karl Ernst (1728–1801)

Ancestry

Sources
 

1703 births
1782 deaths
Duchesses of Courland
Baltic-German people
Baltic nobility
Ladies-in-waiting from the Russian Empire
Burials in the Ducal Crypt of the Jelgava Palace
People from the Duchy of Courland and Semigallia